Ascari is an Italian surname, with a high number of occurrences in Emilia-Romagna and Lombardia. In addition there is a high number of occurrences of the name in Brazil.

Origin and meaning
The name Ascari is derived from the Italian form of the Germanic name Ansgar - Anscario. Ansgar (Latinized Ansgarius; Old Norse Ásgeirr) is a Germanic given name, composed of the elements ans "god", and  gar  "spear", thus meaning "spear of god".

People 
 Antonio Ascari (1888–1925), Italian racing driver
 Alberto Ascari (1918–1955), Italian racing driver
 Stefania Ascari (born 1980), Italian politician
 Tonino Ascari (1942–2008), Italian racing driver

References 

Italian-language surnames